Vigil in a Wilderness of Mirrors is the debut solo album by Scottish neo-progressive rock singer Fish, released in 1990.

Fish had departed Marillion in 1988. Although the recordings for this album finished as early as June 1989, EMI Records decided to delay the release until early 1990 to avoid collision with Marillion's album Seasons End, released in September. However, the track "State of Mind", featuring  former Dire Straits guitarist Hal Lindes on guitar and guest musician John Keeble from Spandau Ballet on drums, was released as a single as early as 16 October 1989, more than three months ahead of the album. Further singles from the album were "Big Wedge" (the actual lead single, 27 December 1989), "A Gentleman's Excuse Me" (5 March 1990) and "The Company" (18 July 1990, only released in Germany).

Production and recording
The album was recorded at Townhouse Studios, London, during the first half of 1989, and produced by Jon Kelly.

Cover art

The cover art was by Mark Wilkinson, who had illustrated all Marillion albums and singles while Fish was their singer and went on to design almost all Fish solo covers. The front cover features a close-up from a larger, very detailed painting/collage inside the gatefold LP cover and the CD booklet. The painting contains many references to the lyrics, political allusions as well as "hidden" messages only understandable to fans (such as the faces of Marillion's keyboardist Mark Kelly and manager John Arnison). The central element is a "hill" consisting of junk consumer goods in a post-apocalyptic landscape, on top of which a couple clad in pseudo-oriental clothes stare into the distance, holding an hourglass. The man's cape, flapping in the wind, resembles the east of Scotland, with the Southern Uplands (Fish's home region) lit by light beams apparently emitted by the hourglass – a reference to Fish's interest in Scottish culture. Only the couple and the top of the hill are on the front cover. The TV sets and the Amiga 500 computer set the couple is standing on show pictures of Fish's face; on the larger version inside, these are replaced with faces from Ingres's painting The Golden Age.

Lyrics
The album is not a concept album, however, several of the songs refer to "the hill" – a metaphor for greed and consumerism.  The songs deal with the themes that Fish has always been passionate about – personal issues and politics – but in single-song format.  "State of Mind" and "Big Wedge" stand out as the most overtly political songs: "State of Mind" strongly articulates the growing civic disillusionment in the late Thatcher years (although it does not mention her by name), "Big Wedge" is an explicit criticism of capitalist greed, American society and policies (the cover of the single features Uncle Sam offering a wedge of dollar bills to the viewer). Incidentally, the lyric had earlier been vetoed by Marillion as "anti-American", they feared it might have hampered their entry into the U.S. market with the next album. Other songs express a more general disgust with materialism ("Vigil", "View From The Hill" and "The Company", the last of which is also a coded account of Fish's disillusionment with and departure from Marillion). "Family Business" refers to domestic violence, the bonus track "The Voyeur (I Like To Watch)" to TV voyeurism. Finally, "A Gentleman's Excuse Me" and "Cliché" are love songs.

The phrase "wilderness of mirrors" is originally from T. S. Eliot's poem Gerontion, but has since become a widely used metaphor for disinformation in spy fiction, where Fish picked it up.

A number of the lyrical concepts on the album (most particularly, the Voice in the Crowd motif) can be heard in Marillion demo sessions released on the 1999 remaster of Clutching at Straws. These sessions were part of the writing process for Marillion's fifth studio album with Fish, which never came to fruition. Many of the musical ideas developed on those demos can be heard on Seasons End, the first Marillion album with Steve Hogarth.

Musical style and contributing musicians
The album covers a variety of musical styles, including progressive rock ("Vigil"), pop rock ("Big Wedge"), hard rock ("View From the Hill"),  and folk music ("The Company"). As he is primarily a lyricist and not a musical composer, Fish collaborated with keyboardist Mickey Simmonds in writing all songs except "View From the Hill", which was co-written and recorded with current Iron Maiden guitarist Janick Gers. Ex-Dire Straits guitarist Hal Lindes contributed additionally to the writing of "State of Mind", "Family Business" and "Cliché". He also played guitar on most tracks, along with Frank Usher, a Fish companion from pre-Marillion times. Drums were handled by Mark Brzezicki (of Big Country), John Keeble (of Spandau Ballet, "State of Mind" only), bass by John Giblin, additional percussion by Luís Jardim, backing vocals by Tessa Niles, who had already appeared on Clutching at Straws, Marillion's last album with Fish (1987), and Carol Kenyon. Apart from these, there  are performances on individual songs by The Kick Horns (brass instruments on "Big Wedge"), Davy Spillane (pipes and tin whistle on "Vigil"), Phil Cunningham (tin whistle, bodhran, accordion on "The Company", "Internal Exile"), Aly Bain (violin on "The Company", "Internal Exile") and Gavyn Wright (credited as Gavin Wright, violin on "The Company", orchestral arrangement on "A Gentleman's Excuse Me", which was recorded with a 23-piece orchestra at Abbey Road Studios).

The band with which Fish toured the album in 1989/1990 consisted of Mickey Simmonds (keyboards), Frank Usher & Robin Boult (guitars), Mark Brzezicki (drums) and Steve Brzezicki (bass, Mark's brother).

Re-releases
Remastered by Calum Malcolm in 1997, the album was reissued three times: 18 December 1997 on Fish's old label Dick Bros Record Company, on 28 October 1998 on Roadrunner Records, and in 2006 by Fish's current label Chocolate Frog. All remastered versions contain the original tracks and five bonus tracks originally released as b-sides of the accompanying singles, plus the original 1989 version of "Internal Exile". The edited and extended versions of the singles' A-sides are not included, a solo live recording of the Marillion song Punch and Judy featured on the single "The Company" is also absent.

Legal dispute with EMI
After Fish left Marillion, their label EMI automatically held the rights to his solo recordings under a leaving-member clause. However, Fish was dissatisfied with EMI's promotion and distribution and sought to leave the contract, which he finally achieved after a drawn-out lawsuit in late 1990/1991. As a result, Vigil in a Wilderness of Mirrors remains Fish's only album on EMI.  EMI still owned the rights, which were licensed back to Fish, who has reissued it as described in the previous section.  The album is now owned by Parlophone/WMG.

Track listing
All songs written by Derek W. Dick (Fish) and Mickey Simmonds, except where noted.

"Vigil" – 8:43
"Big Wedge" – 5:19
"State of Mind" (Dick, Hal Lindes, Simmonds) – 4:42
"The Company" – 4:04
"A Gentleman's Excuse Me" – 4:15
"The Voyeur (I Like To Watch)" – 4:42 (Not on LP)
"Family Business" (Dick, Lindes, Simmonds) – 5:14
"View From The Hill" (Dick, Janick Gers) – 6:38
"Cliché" (Dick, Lindes, Simmonds) – 7:01

Bonus tracks on the remastered version
"Jack and Jill" – 4:28 (B-side of "Big Wedge")
"Internal Exile" (1989 Version) – 4:51
"The Company" (Demo) – 4:30
"A Gentleman's Excuse Me" (Demo) – 3:54
"Whiplash" – 4:25 (B-side of "A Gentleman's Excuse Me")

Personnel
Fish (Derek W. Dick) – vocals
Frank Usher – guitars (Tracks 1–7,9-12 and 14)
Hal Lindes – guitars (1-7 and 11)
Janick Gers – guitars (8)
John Giblin – bass guitars (1-9 and 11)
Mickey Simmonds – keyboards (1-12 and 14); piano (13); drum programming (10 and 12)
Davy Spillane – Pipes (1); Whistles (1)
Phil Cunningham – whistles (1,4 and 11); accordion (4 and 11); bodhrán (4)
Aly Bain – violin (4 and 11)
Gavyn Wright – violin (4)
Alison Jones – violin (12)
Mark Brzezicki – drums (1,2,4,6-9 and 11)
John Keeble – drums (3)
Luís Jardim – percussion (2-4 and 9)
Carol Kenyon – backing vocals (2,3,7 and 9)
Tessa Niles – backing vocals (2,7 and 9)

Charts 
The only Fish album to be released by EMI, it was also his most commercially successful. In February 1990, the album peaked at number 5 in the UK Albums Chart, with the singles reaching no. 32 ("State of Mind", October 1989), no. 25 ("Big Wedge", January 1990) and no. 30 ("Gentleman's Excuse Me", March 1990) on the UK Singles Chart.

References

External links
 Discography information on Fish's official website 

1990 debut albums
Fish (singer) albums
Albums produced by Jon Kelly
EMI Records albums